Lollar Pickups is a Tacoma Washington-based company that creates handmade pickups for electric guitars, the bass, and steel guitars. The company was founded in 1995 by luthier Jason Lollar, a 1979 graduate of the Roberto-Venn School of Luthiery, and author of Basic Pickup Winding and Complete Guide to Making Your Own Pickup Winder was also a contributor to Bart Hopkin's Getting a Bigger Sound: Pickups and Microphones for Your Musical Instrument.

Jimmy Herring and James Williamson are known to use Lollar Pickups.

Products

Lollar pickups are made in the U.S.  The company produces pickups including single coil, gold foil, P-90s, Charlie Christian, and humbuckers for Stratocaster, Telecaster, Humbucker, Fender Jazzmaster, Fender Precision bass, Fender Mustang, Fender Mustang bass, and many others.

References

External links 

 Jason Lollar Guitars Website
 Stephanie Lollar Interview NAMM Oral History Library (2021)
 Jason Lollar Interview NAMM Oral History Library (2021)

Musical instrument manufacturing companies of the United States
Companies based in Tacoma, Washington